In human anatomy, extensor carpi radialis brevis is a muscle in the forearm that acts to extend and abduct the wrist.  It is shorter and thicker than its namesake extensor carpi radialis longus which can be found above the proximal end of the extensor carpi radialis brevis.

Origin and insertion
It arises from the lateral epicondyle of the humerus, by the common extensor tendon; from the radial collateral ligament of the elbow-joint; from a strong aponeurosis which covers its surface; and from the intermuscular septa between it and the adjacent muscles.

The fibres end approximately at the middle of the forearm in the form of a flat tendon, which is closely connected with that of the extensor carpi radialis longus, and accompanies it to the wrist; it passes beneath the abductor pollicis longus and extensor pollicis brevis, beneath the extensor retinaculum, and inserts into the lateral dorsal surface of the base of the third metacarpal bone, with a few fibres inserting into the medial dorsal surface of the second metacarpal bone.

Relations
Under the extensor retinaculum the tendon lies on the back of the radius in a shallow groove, to the ulnar side of that which lodges the tendon of the extensor carpi radialis longus, and separated from it by a faint ridge.

Innervation
Like all the muscles in the posterior forearm, ECR brevis is supplied by a branch of the radial nerve.

Function
It is an extensor, and an abductor of the hand at the wrist joint.  That is, it serves to manipulate the wrist so that the fingers moves away from the palm.
The muscle, like all extensors of the forearm, can be strengthened by exercise that resist its extension; Reverse wrist curls with dumbbells can be performed.

Additional images

References

Muscles of the upper limb